Ladismith is a town and agricultural centre in the western Little Karoo region of South Africa's Western Cape province.

Geography
It is situated adjacent to a series of fertile, irrigated valleys, at an elevation of 550 m above sea level, at the southern base of the Swartberg. It is currently included in the southern Kannaland Local Municipality. The nearest towns are Calitzdorp to the east, Vanwyksdorp and Riversdale to the south and Laingsburg to the north.

History
In 1852 the farm Elandsvlei was set aside for the town, and it became a municipality in 1862. It was named after Lady Juana María Smith, the wife of Sir Harry Smith, one of two towns in South Africa named after her, the other being Ladysmith in KwaZulu-Natal.

Notes

External links
 Ladismith, official page
 

Populated places in the Kannaland Local Municipality
1862 establishments in the British Empire